Tomé Varela da Silva (born 1948 in São Jorge dos Órgãos, Santiago, Cape Verde) is a Cape Verdean writer, poet, philosopher and anthropologist which he studies in an orally tradition and the musical heritage of Cape Verde in which he favored for the usage of Cape Verdean Creole in literature.  Himself, he is the author of several poets and stories.  His most important works were published in the 1980s and the 1990s

He was interviewed along with Corsino Fortes on December 3, 2008 in Nós Fora dos Eixos.  He was interviewed again this time with a newspaper Expresso das Ilhas on the alphabet in Cape Verdean Creole

Works
 Na Bóka Noti (2008) - 3 volumes with history

Poems
 "Ter uma, Ter várias"

See also
Eugénio Tavares
Manuel Veiga

References

Further reading
Gerald M. Moser, Changing Africa : the first literary generation of Independent Cape Verde, American Philosophical Society, Philadelphia, 1992, p. 17-18
 Richard A. Lobban Jr and Paul Khalil Saucier, "Tomé Varela da Silva", in Historical dictionary of the Republic of Cape Verde, Scarecrow Press, Lanham, Maryland ; Toronto ; Plymouth, UK, 2007, p. 79-80

External links
Publications by Tomé Varela da Silva at Memórias de Africa e do Oriente) at the University of Algarve 

1950 births
Living people
Cape Verdean male writers
Cape Verdean poets
Cape Verdean academics
People from Santiago, Cape Verde